Faites sauter la banque! , is a French comedy film from 1964, directed by Jean Girault, written by Louis Sapin and Jean Girault, starring Louis de Funès. The film is known under the titles: "Rob the Bank" (International English title), "El gran golpe" (Spain), "Balduin, der Geldschrank-Knacker" (West Germany), "Faccio saltare la banca" (Italy).

Cast 
 Louis de Funès: Victor Garnier, owner of a store of Chasse et Pêche
 Jean-Pierre Marielle: André Durand-Mareuil, the banker, neighbour of Victor
 Yvonne Clech: Éliane Garnier, wife of Victor
 Anne Doat: Isabelle Garnier, the elder daughter
 Michel Tureau: Gérard Garnier, son
 Catherine Demongeot: Corinne Garnier, the younger daughter
 Georges Wilson: Policeman
 Jean Valmont: Philippe Brécy
 Claude Piéplu: The Priest
 Georges Adet: Gerber, the employee responsible for chests
 Florence Blot: Housemaid
 Nicole Chollet: a client
 Alix Mahieux: Poupette, Belgian cousin
 Michel Dancourt: Casimir, Belgian cousin
 Jean Lefebvre: Construction foreman
 Dominique Zardi
 Guy Grosso: a client
 Yvonne Rozille
 Jean Droze

References

External links 
 
 Faites sauter la banque! (1964) at the Films de France

1964 films
French comedy films
1960s French-language films
French heist films
French black-and-white films
Films directed by Jean Girault
1964 comedy films
1960s French films